Doghs is a village in the Armavir Province of Armenia. In 894, Smbat I defeated Emir Apshin of Atrapatakan in a battle at Doghs. The town's church, dedicated to Surb Stepanos (Saint Stephen), was built in the 19th century. There are also some 19th-century graves in the vicinity. The village has a school (247 students), first aid station, house of culture, and community center.

Gallery

See also 
Armavir Province

References 

World Gazeteer: Armenia – World-Gazetteer.com

Populated places in Armavir Province